This is a list of events from 1917 in France.

Incumbents
President: Raymond Poincaré 
President of the Council of Ministers: 
 until 20 March: Aristide Briand
 20 March-12 September: Alexandre Ribot
 12 September-16 November: Paul Painlevé
 starting 16 November: Georges Clemenceau

Events
 13 February – Dutch dancer Mata Hari is arrested in Paris for spying for Germany.
 9 April – Battle of Arras, a British Empire offensive, begins.
 16 April – Second Battle of the Aisne begins, the main action of the French Nivelle Offensive.
 26 April – The Agreement of Saint-Jean-de-Maurienne, between France, Italy and the United Kingdom, to settle interests in the Middle East, is signed.
 29 April – Architect of the Second Battle of the Aisne and French Commander-in-Chief, General Robert Nivelle, is dismissed and replaced on 15 May by Philippe Pétain.
 3 May – 1917 French Army mutinies begin when the French 2nd Division refuses to follow orders to attack.
 9 May – Second Battle of the Aisne ends in failure, leading to desertions.
 27 May – 1917 French Army mutinies: French Army desertions turn to mutiny as up to 30,000 soldiers leave the front line and reserve trenches and return to the rear at Missy-aux-Bois.
 16 May – Battle of Arras ends.
 1 June – 1917 French Army mutinies: A French infantry regiment seizes Missy-aux-Bois, and declares an anti-war military government. Other French army troops soon apprehend them.
 8 June – 1917 French Army mutinies: French military authorities take action with mass arrests, followed by mass trials.
 15 August – Battle of Hill 70, an Anglo-Canadian offensive, starts on the outskirts of Lens in the Nord-Pas-de-Calais region.
 25 August – Battle of Hill 70 ends.
 15 October – Mata Hari is executed by firing squad at Vincennes for spying.
 15 November – Georges Clemenceau becomes prime minister of France.
 20 November – Battle of Cambrai, a British campaign, begins. First successful use of tanks in a combined arms operation.
 6 December – Battle of Cambrai ends.

Births

January to June
 3 January – Pierre Dervaux, operatic conductor and composer (died 1992)
 24 January – Marcel Hansenne, middle-distance runner (died 2002)
 11 February – Bernard Destremau, tennis player (died 2002)
 16 April – Lucienne Delyle, singer (died 1962)
 22 April – Yvette Chauviré, prima ballerina assoluta (died 2016)
 25 April – Jean Lucas, motor racing driver (died 2003)
 29 May – Élie de Rothschild, banker (died 2007)
 31 May – Jean Rouch, filmmaker and anthropologist (died 2004)

July to December
 14 June – Gilbert Prouteau, poet (died 2012)
 18 July – Henri Salvador, singer (died 2008)
 25 July – Philippe De Lacy, actor (died 1995)
 27 July – Bourvil, actor and singer (died 1970)
 15 August – Philippe Viannay, journalist (died 1986)
 17 August – Paul Tessier, surgeon (died 2008)
 24 September – Jean Hermil, Roman Catholic bishop of Viviers (died 2006)
 20 October – Jean-Pierre Melville, filmmaker (died 1973)
 22 October – Annette Laming-Emperaire, archeologist (died 1977)
 30 October – Maurice Trintignant, motor racing driver (died 2005)
 5 November – Jacqueline Auriol, aviator, holder of several world speed records (died 2000)
 11 November – Madeleine Damerment, World War II heroine (executed) (died 1944)
 19 November – Philippe Ragueneau, journalist and writer (died 2003)
 22 November – Jean-Étienne Marie, composer (died 1989)
 24 November – Maurice Lauré, creator of taxe sur la valeur ajoutée (TVA) (died 2001)

Full date unknown
 Philippe Charbonneaux, industrial designer (died 1998)

Deaths

January to June
 4 January – Auguste Chauveau, professor and veterinarian (born 1827)
 20 January – Amédée Bollée (Amédée père), bell-founder (born 1844)
 5 February – Édouard Drumont, journalist and writer (born 1844) 
 16 February – Octave Mirbeau, journalist, art critic, pamphleteer, novelist and playwright (born 1848)
 17 February – Carolus-Duran, painter (born 1837)
 23 February – Jean Gaston Darboux, mathematician (born 1842)
 26 February – Joseph Jules Dejerine, neurologist (born 1849)
 16 March — Friedrich Manschott, German World War I flying ace (born 1893 in Germany)
 6 April — Friedrich Karl of Prussia, Prince of Prussia (born 1893)
 10 April – Louis Édouard Fournier, painter (born 1857)
 7 May – Albert Ball, English fighter pilot (born 1896 in England)
 10 May – Louis Théophile Joseph Landouzy, neurologist (born 1845)
 25 May – René Dorme, World War I fighter ace (born 1894; killed in action)
 30 June – Antonio de La Gandara, painter and draughtsman (born 1861)

July to December
 3 August –  Stéphane Javelle, astronomer (born 1864)
 8 September – Charles-Edouard Lefebvre, composer (born 1843)
 20 September – Émile Boirac, philosopher (born 1851)
 27 September – Edgar Degas, artist (born 1834)
 3 November – Léon Bloy, novelist, essayist, pamphleteer and poet (born 1846)
 5 November – Henri Amédée de Broglie, nobleman (born 1849)
 15 November – Émile Durkheim, sociologist (born 1858)
 17 November – Auguste Rodin, sculptor (born 1840)
 20 December – Lucien Petit-Breton, cyclist, winner of 1907 and 1908 Tour de France (born 1882)

Full date unknown
 François-Victor Équilbecq, author (born 1872)
 Adolphe Chenevière, novelist (born 1855)

See also
 List of French films of 1917

References

1910s in France